In the United States Army, Marine Corps, Air Force and Space Force, major is a field officer above the rank of captain and below the rank of lieutenant colonel. It is equivalent to the naval rank of lieutenant commander in the other uniformed services. Although lieutenant commanders are considered junior officers by their services (Navy and Coast Guard), the rank of major is that of a senior officer in the United States Army, the United States Marine Corps, and the United States Air Force.

The pay grade for the rank of major is O-4. The insignia for the rank consists of a golden oak leaf, with slight stylized differences between the Army/Air Force version and the Marine Corps version. Promotion to major is governed by the Department of Defense policies derived from the Defense Officer Personnel Management Act of 1980.

Army 
A major in the U.S. Army typically serves as a battalion executive officer (XO) or as the battalion operations officer (S3). Majors can also serve as Company Commanding Officers, a major can also serve as a primary staff officer for a regiment, brigade or task force in the areas concerning personnel, logistics, intelligence, and operations. A major will also be a staff officer / action officer on higher staffs and headquarters. In addition, majors command augmented companies in Combat Service and Service Support units. U.S. Army majors also command Special operations companies, such as U.S. Army Special Forces companies, Civil Affairs companies, Military Information Support Operations companies, and certain types of separate, numbered vice lettered, Military Intelligence companies.

Selected majors in the United States Army attend the 10-month Command and General Staff School at Fort Leavenworth, with a greater number attending satellite schools administered by Fort Leavenworth at Fort Belvoir, Fort Lee, Virginia, Redstone Arsenal, and Fort Gordon. 960 graduated from the Leavenworth course in 2009, at the time the largest class in Army history.

American Revolution 

The Continental Army mostly followed the organization and rank structure of the British Army. A regiment consisted of eight companies with three officers (a captain, lieutenant and ensign) and about 60 enlisted men each. The field-grade officers of a regiment were the colonel, the lieutenant colonel and a major. The major was the regiment's third in command and, at least in theory, would command one of the regiment's two battalions if the regiment were divided for tactical purposes.

American Civil War 

During the American Civil War the Union Army continued to use the existing titles of rank and rank insignia established for the US Army. After the Southern states seceded and became the Confederate States of America, the Confederate Army retained the same titles of rank as its Union counterpart, but developed a new system of rank identification and insignia for its officers.

While Union officers continued to wear their rank insignia on their shoulder straps, Confederate officers wore their rank insignia on the collar (one, two, or three horizontal gold bars for lieutenants and captains; one, two, or three gold stars for field grade officers; and three gold stars surrounded by a wreath for all general officers), as well as rows of gold lace forming an Austrian knot pattern on each sleeve. The number of rows of gold lace increased with the rank of the officer.

Post-Civil War 

In the late 1800s the US Army changed from the traditional ten-company regiment to one of twelve companies organized into three four-company battalions, each commanded by a major. Prior to World War II, battalion commanders became lieutenant colonels. The basic regimental organization remained standard until after the Korean War, when regiments with organic battalions were no longer used as tactical units. Battalions attached to brigades replaced the regiment. Battalions commanded by lieutenant colonels became the US Army's basic tactical unit. As a result, there were only a limited number of command positions for majors although Medical, Special Forces and Aviation companies are usually commanded by majors.

Marine Corps

Air Force 

A major in the Air Force typically has duties as a senior staff officer at the squadron and wing level. In flying squadrons majors are generally flight commanders or assistant directors of operations. In the mission support and maintenance groups majors may occasionally be squadron commanders. In the medical corps, a major may be the head of a clinic or flight.

Space Force

A major in the Space Force typically has duties as a senior staff officer at the squadron and delta levels.

Insignia

References

External links 
 Confederate Army rank insignia: A guide
 Officer rank insignia
 Rank history

Military ranks of the United States Army
Military ranks of the United States Marine Corps
Officer ranks of the United States Air Force
Officer ranks of the United States Space Force